The Ministry of Oil and Gas (MOG); was the governmental body in the Sudan responsible for developing and implementing the government policy for exploiting the oil and gas resources in Sudan in 2017.

References

External links 
 Ministry of Oil and Gas

Government agencies of Sudan
Government ministries of Sudan
Economy of Sudan
Energy ministries